Anita Wörner (born 24 February 1942) is a German middle-distance runner. She competed in the women's 800 metres at the 1964 Summer Olympics.

References

1942 births
Living people
Athletes (track and field) at the 1964 Summer Olympics
German female middle-distance runners
Olympic athletes of the United Team of Germany
Place of birth missing (living people)